The 2021 Troy Trojans football team represented Troy University in the 2021 NCAA Division I FBS football season. The Trojans played their home games at Veterans Memorial Stadium in Troy, Alabama, and competed in the East Division of the Sun Belt Conference.

Prior to the season, Luke Meadows took over as the team's offensive coordinator after the departure of Ryan Pugh.

Previous season
The Trojans finished the 2020 season with a 5–6 record (3–4 in conference), good enough for last in the Sun Belt East Division. The Trojans were not invited to any postseason competition.

Preseason

Recruiting class

|}
Source:

Award watch lists
Listed in the order that they were released

Preseason

Sources:

Sun Belt coaches poll
The Sun Belt coaches poll was released on July 20, 2021. The Trojans were picked to finish fifth in the East Division.

Sun Belt Preseason All-Conference teams

Offense

1st team
Austin Stidham – Offensive Lineman, JR

2nd team
Dylan Bradshaw – Offensive Lineman, SR

Defense

1st team
Will Choloh – Defensive Lineman, JR
Carlton Martial – Linebacker, JR

Schedule
The 2021 schedule consists of 6 home and 6 away games in the regular season. The Trojans will travel to Sun Belt foes Louisiana–Monroe, Texas State, Coastal Carolina, and Georgia State. Troy will play host to Sun Belt foes Georgia Southern,  South Alabama, Louisiana, and Appalachian State.

Troy will host two of the four non-conference opponents at Veterans Memorial Stadium, Southern, from NCAA Division I FCS Southwestern Athletic Conference and Liberty, a FBS Independent, and will travel to Southern Miss of the Conference USA and South Carolina of the Southeastern Conference.

Personnel

Game summaries

Southern

Liberty

at Southern Miss

at Louisiana–Monroe

at South Carolina

Georgia Southern

at Texas State

Coastal Carolina

South Alabama

Louisiana

Appalachian State

at Georgia State

References

Troy
Troy Trojans football seasons
Troy Trojans football